Like, Share, Die is an American adult animated sketch comedy television series created by Mondo Media and broadcast on Parrot TV, premiering on January 29, 2015.  Each 15-minute episode of the series features a number of short Flash cartoons created by Mondo Media, with recurring segments including Deep Space 69, Dick Figures, Chick Figures, Gundarr, Couchmates, and Kung Fu Karl.

Episodes

</onlyinclude>

References

External links
 

2010s American adult animated television series
2010s American anthology television series
2010s American sketch comedy television series
2015 American television series debuts
2015 American television series endings
American adult animation anthology series
American adult animated comedy television series
American flash adult animated television series
English-language television shows
Fusion TV original programming